Transmembrane protein 26 is a protein that in humans is encoded by the TMEM26 gene.

References

Further reading 

 
 

Genes on human chromosome 10